The 1983 United Kingdom general election in England was held on 9 June 1983 for 523 English seats to the House of Commons. The Conservative Party won a landslide majority of English seats, gaining 37 seats for a total of 362. The Labour Party came second, winning 148 MPs, a decline of 45. Labour's share of the vote in England was its lowest since 1918, and its number of English MPs was its smallest since 1931. The SDP–Liberal Alliance won 26.4% of the popular vote, just 0.4% behind Labour, but won only 13 seats compared to 148 for Labour, due to the first-past-the-post electoral system.

Results table

See also
 1983 United Kingdom general election in Northern Ireland
 1983 United Kingdom general election in Scotland
 1983 United Kingdom general election in Wales

Notes

References

England
1983 in England
General elections in England to the Parliament of the United Kingdom